Blenheim is an unincorporated community in Albemarle County, Virginia.

Blenheim, the home of politician and diplomat Andrew Stephenson was added to the National Register of Historic Places in 1976.

Another historic site Historic Blenheim is located considerably north in Fairfax County.

References

Unincorporated communities in Virginia
Unincorporated communities in Albemarle County, Virginia